The Asian section of the 2018 AVC Men's Challenger acted as a qualifier for the 2018 FIVB Volleyball Men's Challenger Cup, for national teams which are members of the Asian Volleyball Confederation (AVC). The tournament was held in Almaty, Kazakhstan from 18 to 20 May 2018. The winners Kazakhstan qualified for the 2018 Challenger Cup.

Qualification 
3 AVC national teams entered qualification.

 (Hosts)

Venue

Pool standing procedure 
 Number of matches won
 Match points
 Sets ratio
 Points ratio
 Result of the last match between the tied teams

Match won 3–0 or 3–1: 3 match points for the winner, 0 match points for the loser
Match won 3–2: 2 match points for the winner, 1 match point for the loser

Round robin 
All times are Almaty Time (UTC+06:00).

|}
|}

Final standing 
{| class="wikitable" style="text-align:center"
|-
!width=40|Rank
!width=180|Team
|- bgcolor=#ccffcc
|1
|style="text-align:left"|
|-
|2
|style="text-align:left"|
|-
|3
|style="text-align:left"|
|}

References

External links 
2018 Challenger Cup Asian Qualifier – official website

2018 FIVB Volleyball Men's Challenger Cup qualification
FIVB
2018 in Kazakhstani sport
International volleyball competitions hosted by Kazakhstan
FIVB Volleyball Men's Challenger Cup qualification